The 1949 Fresno State Bulldogs football team represented Fresno State College—now known as California State University, Fresno—as a member of the California Collegiate Athletic Association (CCAA) during the 1949 college football season. The team was led by head coach Alvin Pierson in his second one-year stint in the position. He had previously been head coach in 1945. The Bulldogs played home games at Ratcliffe Stadium on the campus of Fresno City College in Fresno, California. They finished the season with a record of three wins and eight losses (3–8, 1–3 CCAA). The Bulldogs were outscored 156–344 for the season.

Schedule

Team players in the NFL
The following Fresno State Bulldogs were selected in the 1950 NFL Draft.

Notes

References

Fresno State
Fresno State Bulldogs football seasons
Fresno State Bulldogs football